Akutagawa is a crater on Mercury. It has a diameter of 106 kilometers. Its name was adopted by the International Astronomical Union (IAU) in on September 25, 2015. Akutagawa is named for the Japanese writer Ryūnosuke Akutagawa.

Much of Akutagawa is surrounded by low-reflectance material (LRM), thought to be caused by the carbon mineral graphite.

References

Impact craters on Mercury